Treeton Reading Room F.C. was an English association football club based in Treeton, Yorkshire.

History

League and cup history

Records 
 Best FA Cup performance: 3rd Qualifying Round, 1928–29
 Best FA Amateur Cup performance: 3rd Qualifying Round, 1928–29

References 

Defunct football clubs in South Yorkshire
Sheffield Association League
Sheffield Amateur League